The emblem of the Russian Soviet Federative Socialist Republic (RSFSR) was adopted on 10 July 1918 by the government of the Russian Soviet Federative Socialist Republic (Soviet Union), and modified several times afterwards. It shows wheat as the symbol of agriculture, a rising sun for the future of the Russian nation, the red star (the RSFSR was the last Soviet Republic to include the star in its state emblem, in 1978) as well as the hammer and sickle for the victory of Communism and the "world-wide socialist community of states".

The Soviet Union state motto ("Workers of the world, unite!") in Russian (Пролетарии всех стран, соединяйтесь! — Proletarii vsekh stran, soyedinyaytes′!) is also a part of the coat of arms.

The acronym of the RSFSR is shown above the hammer and sickle, and reads PCФCP, for Российская Советская Федеративная Социалистическая Республика (Russian: Russian Soviet Federative Socialist Republic).

Similar emblems were used by the Autonomous Soviet Socialist Republics (ASSR) within the Russian SFSR; the main differences were generally the use of the republic's acronym and the presence of the motto in the languages of the titular nations (with the exception of the state emblem of the Dagestan ASSR, which had the motto in eleven languages as there is no single Dagestani language).

In 1992, the inscription was changed from RSFSR (РСФСР) to the Russian Federation (Российская Федерация) in connection with the change of the name of the state. In 1993, the Communist design was replaced by the present coat of arms.

History

First version 
On January 24, 1918, the Secretary of the Council of People's Commissars, N.P. Gorbunov, appealed to the All-Russia Union of Masters and Technicians of factory enterprises with a request to provide a sample of a new seal of the Russian SFSR for discussion by the government. By the beginning of March 1918, a print drawing was ready, and a sword was depicted in its center. The authorship of the press is attributed to the artist Alexander Nikolaevich Leo (for certain this fact is not known).

On April 17, 1918, at the meeting of the Council of People's Commissars, the question of the stamp seal was discussed, the  Department of Affairs of the Council of People's Commissars was asked to create a Regulation on the procedure for its use. On April 20, N.P. Gorbunov addressed the commission of the Small Council of People's Commissars with a report on the progress of printing. A print project was approved (with a sword), but the drawing still had to be approved by the Big SNK. Before putting the question to the final statement, Lenin suggested adding the word "socialist" to the press and removing the sword from the press, which was already done at the evening session on April 20. On May 15, at the meeting of the Small Council of People's Commissars, a drawing of the press was signed with the inscription: "Workers 'and Peasants' Government of the Russian Socialist Federative Republic," but again the desire was expressed to put a sword on print. After Lenin's speeches, the Small Council of People's Commissars decided to "throw out a sword from the drawing."

On June 18, 1918, at the meeting of the Council of People's Commissars, Y. Sverdlov's report "On the Soviet Press" was heard, the print project was approved in general, and the details (the question of the sword and the exact text of the inscription) were clarified the next day, June 19. Thus, the seal had the following appearance: in the center on a shield-cartouche framed with grain ears, a crossed sickle and a hammer; below in the vignette text: "ПРОЛЕТАРИИ ВСЕХ СТРАН, СОЕДИНЯЙТЕСЬ !" (instead of the "Council of People's Commissars" in the first draft), and on the circumference: "РОССИЙСКАЯ СОЦИАЛИСТИЧЕСКАЯ ФЕДЕРАТИВНАЯ СОВЕТСКАЯ РЕСПУБЛИКА" (instead of "Workers and Peasants .....").
Artist DV Emelyanov June 20, 1918 began to make a copper seal. The impression of the first press of the SNK was given by VI Lenin in a letter to Clara Zetkin.

Approval 
July 10, 1918 at the closing session of the 5th All-Russian Congress of Soviets of Workers', Peasants', Soldiers' and Cossack deputies adopted the Constitution of the RSFSR, which formally approved the arms of the republic:

"Chapter XVII, Section 6, § 89.
The emblem of the Russian Socialist Federative Soviet Republic consists of images on a red background in the sun's rays of a gold sickle and hammer, placed criss-crosswise with handles downwards, surrounded by a wreath of ears and with the inscription:
a) The Russian Socialist Federative Soviet Republic
b) Workers of all countries, unite! ".

The coat of arms is identical to the seal which was adopted on June 19. The only difference were in the presence of sun rays and in the precise indication of colors. The coat of arms for the first edition of the Constitution was created by the artist from Petrograd minting, A.F. Vasyutinsky.

Other versions 
 In parallel with the Department of Affairs of the Council of People's Commissars, the People's Commissariat for Education dealt with the development of the press. The Arts Department of the People's Commissariat for Education in May 1918 organized a competition to develop the emblem of the Russian Republic. According to the terms of the competition, s figure of a worker and a peasant, the text "РСФСР", the tools of labor, the slogan "Workers of all countries, unite!" should be represented in the arms. According to the results of the contest, the best projects were the projects of Miturich, Altman, and S.V. Chekhonin.
 On the cover of the first edition of the Constitution of the Russian SFSR, another emblem for the RSFSR was painted by the artist E. Lansere. On the figureboard there was a sickle and a hammer in the rays of the sun, around them a wreath tied with a gold ribbon, on the intercepts of which were written the red letters "RSFSR"; above the hammer and sickle the motto; behind the shield two lictor beams (a symbol of power); in the lower part of the branch of oak.

Second version 
In early 1920, the All-Russian Central Executive Committee decided to improve the artistic form of the press (and the coat of arms). July 20, 1920 was approved by the All-Russian Central Executive Committee, a new version of the coat of arms, designed by the artist N.A. Andreev. The motto was now placed on the red ribbon in the lower part of the coat of arms, the name of the republic was given in abbreviated form "RSFSR" and was in the upper part of the shield, on each side of the shield-cartouche surrounded by 7 ears. The image of the abbreviation "RSFSR" instead of the full name "Russian Socialist Federative Soviet Republic" was established by the new Constitution of the RSFSR adopted on May 11, 1925 by the XII All-Russian Congress of Soviets, article 87 of which read:

"87. The State Emblem of the Russian Socialist Federative Soviet Republic consists of an image on a red background in the sunlight of a golden sickle and hammer, placed cross-on-the-cross, handles down, surrounded by a wreath of ears, with the inscription:
a) RSFSR.R. and
b) Workers of all countries, unite! "

On December 30, 1922, the RSFSR, the Ukrainian SSR, the Byelorussian SSR and the Transcaucasian Socialist Federal Soviet Republic formed the Union of Soviet Socialist Republics.

Under Stalin's Constitution, adopted on January 21, 1937, the coat of arms remained unchanged, but the abbreviation of the RSFSR was now deciphered differently: the Russian Soviet Federative Socialist Republic. In the Constitution of 1937 the coat of arms was described as follows:

"Article 148. The State Emblem of the Russian Soviet Federative Socialist Republic consists of an image of a gold sickle and a hammer, placed cross on a cross, with handles down, on a red background in the sun and framed with ears, with the inscription:" RSF.S. R. "and" Workers of all countries, unite! "

First revision 
In accordance with the "Rules of Russian spelling and punctuation" approved in 1956, abbreviations in the Russian language began to be written without dividing points, which was reflected in the description of the emblem in the Constitution of the RSFSR and in the practice of depicting the State Emblem of the RSFSR.

Second revision 
On April 12, 1978, the extraordinary seventh session of the Supreme Soviet of the RSFSR of the ninth convocation adopted a new (so-called "Brezhnev") Constitution (Basic Law) of the RSFSR, the five-pointed star was added to the description of the emblem:Article 180. The State Emblem of the Russian Soviet Federative Socialist Republic is an image of a sickle and a hammer on a red background in the sun and framed with ears of wheat with the inscription: "RSFSR" and "Proletarians of all countries, unite!" At the top of the emblem is a five-pointed star.Officially, the drawing of the new coat of arms with the star was established by a new edition of the Regulations on the State Emblem of the RSFSR, approved by the Decree of the Presidium of the Supreme Soviet of the RSFSR of January 22, 1981, which specified that "in the color image of the State Emblem of the RSFSR, the sickle and the golden hammer, the red star, border ". At the same time, on the color image of the emblem attached to the Regulations, the inscriptions "RSFSR" and "Proletarians of all countries, unite!" were depicted in a dark brown color.

Gallery

See also
State Emblem of the Soviet Union
Emblems of the Soviet Republics
Coat of arms of Russia

References

Russian Soviet Federative Socialist Republic
Russian Soviet Federative Socialist Republic
Russian SFSR
Russian SFSR
Russian SFSR
Russian SFSR
Russian SFSR
Russian SFSR
Russian SFSR
Russian SFSR
Russian SFSR